The 1996 Portuguese Grand Prix was a Formula One motor race held on 22 September 1996 at Autódromo do Estoril in Estoril, Portugal. It was the 15th and penultimate race of the 1996 Formula One season.

Williams' Jacques Villeneuve won the race from team-mate Damon Hill and Ferrari's Michael Schumacher, having overtaken the latter on the outside of the final corner while the two were lapping the slow-moving back-marking Minardi of Giovanni Lavaggi (who at the time was described by BBC TV commentator Jonathan Palmer as "desperately slow" and "there because of his money"). This victory, Villeneuve's fourth of the season, ensured that the Drivers' Championship battle between him and Hill went to the final round in Japan three weeks later.

Benetton's Jean Alesi finished fourth, just behind Schumacher, while Eddie Irvine in the second Ferrari and Gerhard Berger in the second Benetton survived a last-lap collision to take fifth and sixth respectively.

The Portuguese Grand Prix would not be held again until 2020 but this race was held at a new venue at the Algarve International Circuit as opposed to Estoril.

Classification

Qualifying

Race

Championship standings after the race
Bold text indicates who still has a theoretical chance of becoming World Champion.

Drivers'   Championship standings

Constructors'   Championship standings

 Note:   Only the top five positions are included for both sets of standings.

References

Portuguese Grand Prix
Grand Prix
Portuguese Grand Prix
Portuguese Grand Prix